Plzeň municipal election in 1990 was held as part of 1990 Czech municipal elections. It was held on 24 November 1990. Civic Forum has won the highest number of votes. Civic Forum then formed coalition with Social Democrats and Christian Democrats. Zdeněk Mraček became Mayor of Plzeň.

Campaign
The election was held following the Velvet Revolution. Stanislav Loukota became Mayor of Plzeň thanks to the revolution.

Civic Forum was led by Zdeněk Prosek. Themes of party's campaign were tourism, regeneration of Plzeň and creation of a strong potential for the city.
Czechoslovak People's Party ran as a part of centrist coalition named Democratic Union that included Czechoslovak Socialist Party and Green Party. Program of the coalition focused on creation of University of West Bohemia and building of Hospital. Christian Democratic Party led coalition of centre-right parties. It opposed politics of Civic Forum in the city and blamed it of broken promises. The main focus was cleaning of public offices from Communists. Social Democratic Party was support of all forms of ownership and creation of jobs. Election was considered a referendum about previous communist regime which led to a strong performance of Civic Forum.

Results

Aftermath
Civic Forum planned to nominate Zdeněk Prosek for the position of Mayor but Democratic Union was against during the coalition talks. In the end, Civic Forum nominated Zdeněk Mraček who became Mayor afterwards.

References

External links
 Results

1990
1990 elections in Europe
1990s elections in Czechoslovakia